Simo Mouidi (born 20 August 1967) is a retired Moroccan football defender.

References

1967 births
Living people
Moroccan footballers
FC St. Gallen players
SC Kriens players
Association football defenders
Swiss Super League players
Morocco international footballers
Moroccan expatriate footballers
Expatriate footballers in Switzerland
Moroccan expatriate sportspeople in Switzerland